TITAN2D is a geoflow simulation software application, intended for geological researchers. It is distributed as free software.

Overview
TITAN2D is a free software application developed by the Geophysical Mass Flow Group at the State University of New York (SUNY) at Buffalo. 

TITAN2D was developed for the purpose of simulating granular flows (primarily geological mass
flows such as debris avalanches and landslides) over
digital elevation models (DEM)s of natural terrain.
The code is designed to help scientists and civil protection authorities assess the
risk of, and mitigate, hazards due to dry debris flows and avalanches.
TITAN2D combines numerical simulations of a flow with digital elevation data of natural terrain
supported through a Geographical Information System (GIS) interface such as GRASS.

TITAN2D is capable of multiprocessor runs.
A Message Passing Interface (MPI) Application
Programming Interface (API) allows
for parallel computing on multiple processors, which effectively increases computational power, decreases computing time,
and allows for the use of large data sets.

Adaptive gridding allows
for the concentration of computing power on regions of special
interest. Mesh refinement captures the complex flow features that occur at the leading edge
of a flow, as well as locations where rapid changes in topography induce large mass and momentum fluxes.  Mesh
unrefinement is applied where solution values are relatively constant
or small to further improve computational efficiency.

TITAN2D requires an initial volume and shape estimate for the starting material, a basal friction angle, and an
internal friction angle for the simulated granular flow. The direct outputs of the program are
dynamic representations of a flow's depth and momentum.  Secondary or derived outputs include flow velocity, and such field-observable quantities as run-up height, deposit thickness, and inundation area.

Mathematical Model

The TITAN2D program is based upon a depth-averaged model for an incompressible
Coulomb continuum, a “shallow-water” granular flow.  The conservation equations
for mass and momentum are solved with a Coulomb-type friction
term for the interactions between the grains of the media and between the granular material
and the basal surface. The resulting hyperbolic system
of equations is solved using a parallel, adaptive mesh,
Godunov scheme.  The basic form of the depth-averaged governing equations appear as follows.

The depth-averaged conservation of mass is:

The depth-averaged x,y momentum balances are:

See also
Geologic hazards
 Lahar
 Pyroclastic flow
Debris flow
landslides

References

 Titan2D User Guide, Release 2.0.0, 2007.07.09; Geophysical Mass Flow Group, University at Buffalo (http://www.gmfg.buffalo.edu).
 A.K. Patra, A.C. Bauer, C.C. Nichita, E.B. Pitman, M.F. Sheridan, M. Bursik, B. Rupp, A. Webber, A. Stinton, L. Namikawa, and C. Renschler, Parallel Adaptive Numerical Simulation of Dry Avalanches Over Natural Terrain, Journal of Volcanology and Geophysical Research, 139 (2005) 1-21.
 E.B. Pitman, C.C. Nichita, A.K. Patra, A.C. Bauer, M.F. Sheridan, and M. Bursik, Computing Granular Avalanches and Landslides, Physics of Fluids, Vol. 15, Number 12 (December 2003).
 M.F. Sheridan, A.J. Stinton, A. Patra, E.B. Pitman, A. Bauer, C.C. Nichita, Evaluating Titan2D mass-flow model using the 1963 Little Tahoma Peak avalanches, Mount Rainier, Washington, Journal of Volcanology and Geophysical Research, 139 (2005) 89-102.
 E.B. Pitman, C. Nichita, A. Patra, A.C. Bauer, M. Bursik and A. Webber, A Numerical Study of Granular Flows on Erodible Surfaces, March 24, 2003.
 B. Rupp, M. Bursik, A. Patra, B. Pitman, A. Bauer, C. Nichita, R. Saucedo, J. Macias, 2003,Simulation of Pyroclastic Flows of Colima Volcano, Mexico, Using the TITAN2D Program, AGU/EGS/EUG Spg Meet., Geophysical Research Abstracts, 5, 12857.
 E. Munoz, D. Palacios, L. Namikawa, M. Sheridan, C. Renschler, Contrast Between Computer Simulations and Field Observation of Popocatepetl Lahars, Geophysical Research Abstracts, Vol. 6, 04599, 2004, European Geosciences Union.

External links
 Geophysical Mass Flow Group (TITAN2D Distribution Site)
 Titan2d-mod (released in 2016, a version modified from titan 3.0.0, 2011)
 Processors

Scientific simulation software
Geology software